The starosta  or starost (Cyrillic: старост/а, Latin: capitaneus) is a term of Slavic origin denoting a community elder whose role was to administer the assets of a clan or family estates. The Slavic root of starost translates as "senior". Since the Middle Ages, it has meant an official in a leadership position in a range of civic and social contexts throughout Central and Eastern Europe. In terms of a municipality, a starosta was historically a senior royal administrative official, equivalent to the County Sheriff or the outdated Seneschal, and analogous to a gubernator. In Poland, a starosta would administer crown territory or a delineated district called a starostwo.

In the early Middle Ages, the starosta could head a settled urban or rural community or other communities, such as a church starosta, or an artel starosta, etc. The starosta also functioned as the master of ceremonies.

Poland

Kingdom of Poland

In the Kingdom of Poland and the Polish–Lithuanian Commonwealth, the Starosta was from the 15th century the office of a territorial administrator, usually conferred on a local landowner and member of the nobility, Szlachta. Until the Third Partition of Poland in 1795, there were two types of Starosta:
Castle Starosta, (formerly Castellan or capitaneus cum iurisdictione), Starosta grodowy as local representative of the king, would supervise fiscal, judicial administration and matters of crime in a district, termed starostwo, and 
Land-Starosta, Starosta niegrodowy, capitaneus sine iurisdictione, whose role (they were invariably male) was as overseer of crown land tenants and of the land tenure (see tenant-in-chief) without any real obligations. The absence of an Interdict against the accumulation of thus administered districts resulted in some nobles becoming immensely rich and earning the sobriquet, magnates.

There were also general starosts who were provincial governors. All starosts disappeared after the Kosciuszko Insurrection in 1794 and were not reinstated until after World War I when their role was altered.

Contemporary
In contemporary Poland, starosta designates a district administrator, who heads the district administration starostwo and manages a powiat district, akin to the leader of a town or rural council.

Czech Republic and Slovakia
In the Czech Republic and Slovakia starosta is the title of a mayor of a town or village. Mayors of major cities use the title primátor. The term corresponds to the Austrian or German Bürgermeister.

Holy Roman Empire
Historically, the title "Starost" was also used in parts of the Holy Roman Empire but was not tied to ownership of land. The German word Starostei referred to the office or crown land district of a Starost. In German, the title starost/starosta is also translated as Hauptmann and  analogous to a gubernator.

Other countries

In Ruthenia (Kievan Rus) it was a lower government official. 
In Lithuania since 1991, seniūnas is the title of the head of a province.
In Galicia and Bukovina under Austrian rule a starosta supervised the county administration.
In Russia the word was used until the early 20th century to denote the elected leader of an obshchina.
In Ukraine during 1918 it was a post of an appointed official who represented the central government in regions. From 2015 is an official of a village that is a part of the united commune.
In Romania, in the Middle Ages, the word was used until the early 19th century to denote the elected leader of the merchants or craftsmen guilds.

See also
 Offices in the Polish–Lithuanian Commonwealth
 Seniūnija
 Starets

References

External links
Encyclopedia of Ukraine: Starosta
 Starosta in the Internet Encyclopedia of Ukraine

Heads of local government
Slavic titles
Noble titles
Polish titles
Polish words and phrases
Local government in the Russian Empire
Titles of national or ethnic leadership